Croxden is a village in the county of Staffordshire, England, south of Alton and north of Uttoxeter. The population of the civil parish as taken at the 2011 census was 255.

The village is the site of Croxden Abbey, founded in 1176 by the Cistercians, but now ruined. It is privately owned and in the care of English Heritage.

See also
Listed buildings in Croxden

References 

Villages in Staffordshire
Staffordshire Moorlands